Break Up Story is a Bengali web series released on 24 July 2020 on the Bengali OTT platform. The entire series has been shot during the lockdown period during the COVID-19 situation. The series is directed by Mainak Bhaumik.  After the release of Bornoporichoy and Goyenda Junior in 2019, Mainak Bhaumik made his debut in the Bengali web series as a director through Break Up Story.
The series features Anindita Bose, Saurav Das, Sauraseni Maitra, Tuhina Das, Sohini Sarkar, Ranojoy Bishnu, Aryann Bhowmik, Chandrayee Ghosh and Alivia Sarkar.

Plot
A romantic drama showcases breakup tales of five couples and the various reasons that prompt them to part ways. However, the fun part is that every character in the series is somehow connected. Breakups can be as romantic as hook-ups, except with a sad ending. A intriguing tale of couples as they try to salvage their love when their relationships go sinfully wrong.

Cast 
 Saurav Das
 Sohini Sarkar
 Chandrayee Ghosh
 Sauraseni Maitra
 Anindita Bose
 Aryann Bhowmik
 Tuhina Das
 Alivia Sarkar
 Ranojoy Bishnu

Overview

Reception 
Set in the backdrop of love and break up, based in the city of Kolkata. With the free flow of story-telling, the series received a great response from the audience.

Season 1 (2020)
The series started streaming on the OTT platform hoichoi from 24 July 2020 with five episodes.

Episodes

References

External links

Indian web series
2017 web series debuts
Bengali-language web series
Hoichoi original programming